Canon’s F series is Canon’s series of manual focus 35 mm single lens reflex cameras.  The first professional camera, the F-1, was introduced in March 1971 while the final camera, the New F-1 High Speed Motor Drive Camera, was released in February 1984.  All have a Canon FD or FL lens mount compatible with Canon’s extensive range of manual-focus lenses.

FD mount

Professional 

 Canon F-1 (March 1971)
 Canon F-1 High Speed Motor Drive Camera (February 1972)
 Canon F-1N / Canon F-1 (Later Model) (September 1976)
 Canon New F-1 (September 1981)
 Canon New F-1 High Speed Motor Drive Camera (February 1984)

Amateur 

 Canon FTb (March 1971)
 Canon FTb-N (July 1973)
 Canon EF (November 1973)
 Canon TLb (September 1974)
 Canon TX (March 1975)

FL mount 

 Canon FX (April 1964)
 Canon FP (October 1964)
 Canon Pellix (April 1965)
 Canon FT QL (March 1966)
 Canon Pellix QL (March 1966)
 Canon TL (February 1968)

References

F Series